Port Chicago can refer to:

 Port Chicago, California, former town in the United States
 Port Chicago disaster, deadly explosion that occurred at the Port Chicago Naval Magazine in Port Chicago, California on 17 July 1944, killing 320 people
 Port Chicago Naval Magazine National Memorial, at the site of the disaster